The Enchanted Drawing is a 1900 silent film directed by J. Stuart Blackton. It is best known for containing the first animated sequences recorded on standard picture film, which has led Blackton to be considered the father of American animation.

Contents 
The film shows a man drawing a cartoon face on an easel. He draws a bottle of wine and a glass, then takes them off the paper and has a drink. He then gives the cartoon face a drink of wine, and the face breaks into a broad smile. He then draws a hat on the face's head, removes it, and puts it on. Next a cigar appears in the face's mouth, and the man removes it to the face's unhappiness. He then places all of the objects back into the image, and the face's eyes and grin grow wider in appreciation.

Technique 
It is a combination of a silent film and stop motion animation.

See also 
 List of American films of 1900

References

External links 

 
 
 The Enchanted Drawing at the Library of Congress

1900 films
1900 animated films
American films with live action and animation
American silent short films
Vitagraph Studios short films
American black-and-white films
Films directed by J. Stuart Blackton
1900 comedy films
Silent American comedy films
1900s animated short films
Articles containing video clips
American comedy short films
Films about wine
1900s American animated films